The millerbird (Acrocephalus familiaris) is a species of Old World warbler in the family Acrocephalidae. It has two subspecies, A. f. kingi and A f. familiaris. The latter, the Laysan millerbird, became extinct sometime between 1916 and 1923. The former, the critically endangered Nihoa millerbird, remains the only race left, inhabiting the small island Nihoa in Hawaii, though it has since been reintroduced to Laysan. It is the only Old World warbler to have colonised Hawaii, although there is no fossil evidence that the species ever had a distribution beyond these two islands.

Millerbirds form long-term pair bonds and defend territories over a number of years. Breeding occurs variably from January to September depending on food availability.

Identification 
A small old-world warbler that occurs only on Nihoa and Laysan in the Northwestern Hawaiian Islands. Unlikely to be confused with any other species; the only other passerines on those islands are finches. Does not occur on the main Hawaiian Islands. Prefers dense, low vegetation. Usually secretive and hard to see well, but males sometimes sing from an exposed perch. Song and calls are harsh chirps and churring.

References 

 Morin, Marie P., Sheila Conant and Patrick Conant. (1997). Laysan and Nihoa Millerbird (Acrocephalus familiaris), The Birds of North America Online (A. Poole, Ed.). Ithaca: Cornell Lab of Ornithology; Retrieved from the Birds of North America Online:

External links 

BirdLife Species Factsheet.
 

Acrocephalus (bird)
Birds of Hawaii
Endemic fauna of Hawaii
Natural history of the Northwestern Hawaiian Islands
Critically endangered fauna of Hawaii
Birds described in 1892